Jean Marchand (1918–1988) was a French-Canadian public figure, trade unionist and politician.

Jean Marchand may also refer to:

 Jean-Baptiste Marchand (1863–1934), French diplomat
 Jean Omer Marchand (1873–1936), architect (including Peace Tower)
 Jean Marchand (painter) (1882–1940), French painter
 Jean Gabriel Marchand (1765–1851), French attorney and army officer
 Jean José Marchand (1920–2011), French critic of art, cinema and literature
 Jean Baptiste Louis DeCourtel Marchand, French officer
 Jean Marchand,  Québécois actor